The 2022 OL Reign season was the team's tenth season of play and their tenth season in the National Women's Soccer League, the top division of women's soccer in the United States.

In December 2021, the team announced that it would start playing its home games at Lumen Field in Seattle, Washington.

Team

Technical staff

Current roster

Competitions 

All times are in PT unless otherwise noted.

Preseason and friendlies

Thorns Preseason Tournament

The Women's Cup

Regular season

Regular-season standings

Results summary

Results by matchday

Playoffs

Challenge Cup

Group stage

Divisional standings

Knockout stage

Appearances and goals

|-
|colspan="14" |Goalkeepers:
|-

|-
|colspan="14" |Defenders:
|-

|-
|colspan="14" |Midfielders:
|-

|-
|colspan="14" |Forwards:
|-

|-
|colspan="14" |Players who left the team during the season:
|-

|-
|colspan="14" |Own goals for:
|-

|-

Transfers
For incoming transfers, dates listed are when OL Reign officially signed the players to the roster. Transactions where only the rights to the players are acquired (e.g., draft picks) are not listed. For outgoing transfers, dates listed are when OL Reign officially removed the players from its roster, not when they signed with another team. If a player later signed with another team, her new team will be noted, but the date listed here remains the one when she was officially removed from the OL Reign roster.

Transfers in

Draft picks

Draft picks are not automatically signed to the team roster. Only those who are signed to a contract will be listed as incoming transfers.

Transfers out

Loans in

Loans out

New contracts

Awards

NWSL annual awards

Nominees announced on October 14, 2022
 Coach of the Year:  Laura Harvey (finalist)
 Defender of the Year:  Alana Cook and  Sofia Huerta (finalists)
 Goalkeeper of the Year:  Phallon Tullis-Joyce (finalist)
 Best XI:  Alana Cook and  Sofia Huerta
 Second XI:  Jess Fishlock,  Rose Lavelle, and  Megan Rapinoe

NWSL Player of the Month

NWSL Team of the Month

NWSL Player of the Week

NWSL Save of the Week

NWSL Challenge Cup All-Tournament Team

The Women's Cup
 Most Valuable Player:  Tziarra King

References

External links 
 

OL Reign seasons
2022 in sports in Washington (state)
2022 National Women's Soccer League season
American soccer clubs 2022 season
Sports in Seattle